Clabber may refer to:
Clabber, a card game
Clabber (food), a food made of curdled milk
Clabber (horse) (1936–1947) an American Quarter Horse stallion
Clabber Girl, a brand of baking powder, baking soda, and corn starch popular in the United States
Clabbers, a variation of Scrabble